Num may refer to:

 Short for number
 Num (god), the creator and high god of the Nenets people of Siberia
 Short for the Book of Numbers of the Hebrew Bible
 Khnum, a god of Egyptian mythology
 Mios Num, an island of western New Guinea
 Num, Nepal
 num, the code for the Niuafo'ou language of Tonga

NUM may refer to:

 National Union of Manufacturers, a former employers' association in the United Kingdom
 National Union of Mineworkers (Great Britain)
 National Union of Mineworkers (South Africa)
 National University of Mongolia
 New Ulster Movement in Northern Ireland
 National Ugly Mugs, a reporting system for sex workers, run by UK Network of Sex Work Projects
 Nurse Unit Manager
 n-um.com (N-UM), popular website about different islam topics, in Bosnian language
 NUM, the National Rail station code for Northumberland Park railway station, London, England

See also
 
 
 Nummi (disambiguation)
 Number (disambiguation)
 Numb (disambiguation)